"Amazing Love" is a song written by John Schweers, and recorded by American country music artist Charley Pride.  It was released in September 1973 as the first single and title track from the album Amazing Love.  The song was Pride's thirteenth number-one single on the U.S. country chart. The single went to number one for a single week and spent thirteen weeks on the chart.

Cover versions
The song also recorded by Conway Twitty on his 1974 album Honky Tonk Angel.

Chart performance

References

1973 singles
1973 songs
Charley Pride songs
Conway Twitty songs
Song recordings produced by Jack Clement
RCA Records singles
Songs written by John Schweers